Events from the year 1707 in Sweden

Incumbents
 Monarch – Charles XII

Events

 
 
 
 
 31 August - Treaty of Altranstädt (1707) signed between Charles XII of Sweden and Joseph I, Holy Roman Emperor.  
 - Ramlösa if founded.

Births

 23 May - Carl von Linné, botanist, physician and zoologist  (died 1778)

Deaths

 - Brita von Cöln, painter (year of birth unknown)
 - Catarina Wentin, royal midwife  (born 1637)

References

External links

 
Years of the 18th century in Sweden
Sweden